The 23rd Senate of Puerto Rico was the upper house of the 15th Legislative Assembly of Puerto Rico that met from January 2, 2005 to January 1, 2009. All members were elected in the General Elections of 2004. The Senate had a majority of members from the New Progressive Party (PNP).

The body is counterparted by the 27th House of Representatives of Puerto Rico in the lower house.

Leadership

Members

Membership

References

23
2005 in Puerto Rico
2006 in Puerto Rico
2007 in Puerto Rico
2008 in Puerto Rico
2009 in Puerto Rico